Pagida salticiformis, is a species of spider of the genus Pagida. It is endemic to Sri Lanka.

References

Thomisidae
Endemic fauna of Sri Lanka
Spiders of Asia
Spiders described in 1883